The NS Class 3400 was a series of diesel multiple unit which were in service in the Netherlands between 1996 and 2017 and were built by Duewag, Talbot and SIG between 1996 and 1998. They were operated by the Nederlandse Spoorwegen and between 1999 until 2014 under lease by Syntus. The class is referred to as DM'90 meaning diesel rolling stock (Diesel Materieel in Dutch) of the 1990s or Buffel, which means Buffalo. The DM'90 series was developed alongside the short lived, electric SM'90 ("stopping-train" or commuter rolling stock of the 1990s) series with which it shares the unusual body cross section. Class 3400 were the last DMUs in service with NS, the older DE3 ("Plan U") and DH1/2 ("Wadloper") series having been replaced by the diesel electric Stadler GTW which are still in use with other operators in the Netherlands. Since January 2018, all units are now stored out of service and 32 units have been sold to SKPL - Polish private railway operator.

History

In 1993, NS ordered 53 units of the class from Talbot, now Bombardier. The electrical systems, train controls, and diagnostic systems were delivered by Holec Ridderkerk, now Alstom. Duewag installed the interiors of the trains in Krefeld, after which the units were transferred to the Netherlands. Unit 3401 was delivered on March 12, 1996, and the last unit, 3453, was brought into service in 1998.

Originally there were intentions to order a follow-up series of the 2-car units, alongside the possible development of a single-car unit, however these were never realised due to the privatisation of many of the diesel-served lines.

The rolling stock was introduced in the end of the 1990s on a large portion of the non-electrified lines in the Netherlands. In the period thereafter many of these routes were transferred to private sector operators, Syntus and several other operators used the sets for their services, others were temporarily used on electrified sectors for local services.

Description

This allowed a 5 abreast seating arrangement, however the trains were eventually delivered with only the standard 4 abreast configuration.

The bogies were Stork-manufactured RMO 9000 series, also used on the SM'90, and DD-IRM trains.

The combination of disk brakes and quiet operation results that the trains were often poorly detected by axle counters which are commonly found on the lines where the DM'90 operates. Train-protection is provided by ATB-NG. For cross-border operations out of Heerlen, three sets were equipped with the German PZB train protection system along with boarding steps to accommodate the lower platform height.

Between 2008 and 2013, the sets operating between Zwolle and Kampen were provided with passenger information displays showing connection information in Zwolle, as tendered by the province of Overijssel.

The trains were equipped with heating provided by both engine heat and, when necessary, additional electrical heaters. In depots, the heaters can be powered externally to avoid the need for operating the motors. Air conditioning is only present in the driver cab.

Specific operations
3403 and 3410 were branded for the Zwolle - Kampen service.
3401, 3402, 3404, 3412 and 3414 were branded for the Apeldoorn - Zutphen service.

Previous operations
Operations on these lines transferred from Syntus to Arriva since the start of the public transport timetable 2013.

Details

Syntus details

Gallery

References

Diesel multiple units of the Netherlands
Duewag
Waggonfabrik Talbot